Lake Mountain may refer to

 Lake Mountains, a mountain range in northwest Utah County, Utah, United States, overlooking Utah Lake.
 Lake Mountain (Victoria), a mountain and cross-country ski resort in Victoria, Australia.